Aleksey Vladimirovich Lovchev (born 13 June 1989) is a Russian weightlifter.

Career
He competed at the 2013 World Championships in the Men's +105 kg, winning the bronze medal and the European Championships 2014, winning the gold medal in the Snatch, Clean and Jerk and total.

In the 2015 World Championships he competed in the +105kg category, winning gold medals in the Snatch, Clean and Jerk, and Total, with a 211 kg Snatch and 264 kg world record Clean and Jerk for a world record 475 kg total. However, Lovchev failed a doping test and was stripped of the World Championship  gold medal and world records.

In May 2016, Lovchev was banned for four years after failing A and B-samples: he tested positive for ipamorelin, a hormone growth drug. He contested this decision at Court of Arbitration for Sport, but his appeal was dismissed.

Major results

See also
Hossein Rezazadeh

References

External links
 
 

1989 births
Living people
Russian male weightlifters
World Weightlifting Championships medalists
Russian sportspeople in doping cases
Doping cases in weightlifting
Universiade medalists in weightlifting
Universiade bronze medalists for Russia
European Weightlifting Championships medalists
Medalists at the 2011 Summer Universiade
20th-century Russian people
21st-century Russian people